USS Fargo (CL-106), named after the city of Fargo, North Dakota, was the lead ship of her class of light cruisers of the United States Navy, most of which were canceled due to the end of World War II.

The Fargo-class cruisers were a modified version of the previous  design; the main difference was a more compact pyramidal superstructure with a single trunked funnel, intended to improve AA gun arcs of fire.

The cruiser was launched 25 February 1945 by New York Shipbuilding Corporation, Camden, New Jersey, sponsored by Mrs. F. O. Olsen, and commissioned 9 December 1945.

Service history

Fargo sailed from Philadelphia on 15 April 1946, with Vice Admiral Bernard H. Bieri embarked for a goodwill cruise to Bermuda, Trinidad, Recife, Rio de Janeiro and Montevideo, from which she took departure on 31 May for the Mediterranean.  During this tour of duty, she visited a variety of ports in Turkey, Lebanon, Greece, Italy, and France, as well as North Africa and served as American representative at Trieste, then troubled by dissension between Italy and Yugoslavia over the city's status.

Returning to New York City on 2 March 1947, Fargo sailed once more for the Mediterranean on 20 May, and during this tour of duty, served for one month as flagship for Commander, Naval Forces Mediterranean.  Returning to Newport on 13 September, she prepared for extensive Atlantic Fleet exercises in October and November in the waters from Bermuda to Newfoundland, during which she carried Vice Admiral Arthur W. Radford, Commander 2nd Task Fleet.

Through her remaining two years of service, Fargo completed two more tours of duty in the Mediterranean, and twice joined in large scale exercises in the Caribbean.  She was decommissioned and placed in reserve, berthed at Bayonne, New Jersey, 14 February 1950, stricken from the Naval Vessel Register on 1 March 1970, and sold on 18 August 1971 to Union Minerals and Alloys Corporation, Kearney, New Jersey.

A large model of the USS Fargo was on display at the main branch of the Fargo Public Library for many years. The model was moved to the Cass County Historical Society at Bonanzaville before being moved to the Fargo air and space museum.

See also

Footnotes

Notes

Citations

References

External links

 
  hazegray.org: USS Fargo (CL-106)

 

Fargo-class cruisers
Ships built by New York Shipbuilding Corporation
1945 ships
World War II cruisers of the United States